A. P. Leto High School is a public high school within the Hillsborough County Public Schools system and is located at 4409 W Sligh Avenue in Tampa, Florida, U.S.. In addition to the four high school grades, Leto also hosts adult night services. Larissa McCoy, the current principal, was appointed in 2017.

Demographics
As of 2014, Leto High School is 75% Hispanic, .2% White, 23% Black,  and < 0% other

The school currently operates as a Title I school (receives additional funds from the federal government) with 98.4% of the student population eligible for free or reduced lunch.

History

Originally called A.P. Leto Comprehensive High School, it was named in honor of Ateo Phillip Leto, a former principal at Jefferson High School and at Chamberlain High School in Tampa.  He was originally to serve as the school's first principal, but he died before the school year began. The first principal of Leto was Frank M. Farmer.

Established in 1965 with grades 9-11, which meant that the first graduating class was not until 1967, Leto was the first comprehensive high school in Hillsborough County. It was "comprehensive" because in addition to the high school academic curriculum, Leto offered several modern vocational options for students. Although the largest school in Hillsborough County, it originally lacked a gymnasium, a stadium, baseball and softball fields, which were added in the 1970s. According to Leto's official website, the students of the first graduating class of 1967 chose the school's colors, mascot, alma mater and several other traditions that continue to be practiced at Leto High.

Magnet School 
Created in 2013, Collegiate Academy is a magnet program provided by Hillsborough Community College. Students enrolled in this program will take college classes while on Leto's campus earning a two-year Associate of Arts degree while also earning their high school diploma.

Publications
 The Talon - student-run and produced yearbook

School Report Card
According to the Florida Department of Education, Leto High received the following "grades" between 1998 and 2018:
2017-18 = C
2016-17 = C
2015-16 = ?
2014-15 = F
2013-14 = F
2008-09 = D
2007-08 = D
2006-07 = F
2005-06 = F
2004-05 = D
2003-04 = D
2002-03 = D
2001-02 = D
2000-01 = C
1999-00 = C
1998-99 = C

Improvement
Leto was one of 16 schools nationwide selected by the College Board for inclusion in the EXCELerator "School Improvement Model" program, beginning in the 2007–2008 school year. The project was funded by the Bill & Melinda Gates Foundation.

Leto during its 50th Anniversary received funding to remodel and restore the campus to how it was during its first opening.

Notable alumni

Hercules '74 - professional wrestler
Gary Huff '69 - NFL football player who quarterbacked the first win in Buccaneers history in 1977
Matt Vogler - football player
Michael Jenkins (wide receiver) - football player

References

External links 
 

Leto
Leto
Public high schools in Florida
1964 establishments in Florida